Inocencio Bertolín Izquierdo (21 July 1911 – 13 August 1948), known as Bertolí, was a Spanish footballer who played as a right winger.

He began his career at UE Sants in Barcelona, but was signed without their consent by Levante FC and then taken by their city rivals Valencia CF. He spent most of his career at Valencia (1933–1945), despite spending the Spanish Civil War (1936–39) at Racing Ferrol while serving in the navy there. He played in the 1940 Copa del Generalísimo Final in which Valencia defeated RCD Español 3–1, as well as the 1945 final which they lost 3–2 to Athletic Bilbao.

He made his only international appearance for Spain in a friendly in Barcelona on 23 February 1936, a 2–1 defeat to Germany.

Before his death in 1948, at the age of 36, he was due to become the new manager of Almería CF.

Honours
La Liga (2): 1941–42, 1943–44
Copa del Rey (1): 1941
Runner-up (1): 1945

References
General
 Bertolí at Ciber Che
 

Specific

External links
 

1911 births
1948 deaths
People from Alto Palancia
Sportspeople from the Province of Castellón
Footballers from the Valencian Community
Spanish footballers
Spain international footballers
Valencia CF players
Racing de Ferrol footballers
La Liga players
Association football wingers
Catalonia international guest footballers
UE Sants players